Identity was a planned massively multiplayer online role-playing game (MMORPG) that was developed and published by Asylum Entertainment, Inc. for Microsoft Windows and macOS. In the game, players would have the freedom to do a variety of activities in an open world setting, including karaoke and paintballing and join a wide set of career options. The game was to allow players to customize and furnish their own homes. During its one month Kickstarter campaign, Identity raised CA$187,859 by 4,218 backers.

The Kickstarter promised a December 2016 release with full access for backers but failed to deliver its promise. In September 2018 the developers announced that the Town Square Module, an Early Access version of the game with limited features, would be available to those who pledged on the game's Kickstarter campaign or paid a set fee two years after the promised Town Square's release. It was released on Steam on November 30, 2018 to a generally negative user response.

References

External links 
 
 Kickstarter page

Cancelled video games
Early access video games
Kickstarter-funded video games
Massively multiplayer online role-playing games